French electronic music duo Daft Punk released four studio albums, two live albums, one compilation album, one soundtrack album, four remix albums, two video albums, twenty-two singles and nineteen music videos. Group members Thomas Bangalter and Guy-Manuel de Homem-Christo met in 1987 while studying at the Lycée Carnot secondary school. They subsequently recorded several demo tracks together, forming Daft Punk in 1993. Their debut single "The New Wave" was released the following year on the Soma Quality Recordings label. Daft Punk first found commercial success with the release of their second single "Da Funk", which peaked at number seven in France and topped the United States Billboard Hot Dance Club Play chart.

After signing to Virgin Records, the duo released their debut studio album Homework in January 1997. The album peaked at number three in France, earning a platinum certification from the Syndicat National de l'Édition Phonographique (SNEP). The success of Homework also brought worldwide attention to progressive house music, and it has since been viewed as a landmark album of the genre. The Homework single "Around the World" became a top five hit in several European countries and gave the duo their first entry on the US Billboard Hot 100, where it peaked at number 61. The album also produced the singles "Burnin'" and "Revolution 909".

Daft Punk released their second studio album Discovery in February 2001. The album peaked at number two in France and attained a triple platinum certification from the SNEP. Discovery also performed well internationally, becoming a top ten chart hit in countries such as Australia, Canada and the United Kingdom. "One More Time", the album's first single, became a number-one hit in France and on the Billboard dance chart. The single also reached the top ten on the charts of Australia, Germany and the United Kingdom. An additional six singles were released from Discovery: "Aerodynamic", "Digital Love", "Harder, Better, Faster, Stronger", "Face to Face" and "Something About Us". Daft Punk also oversaw the release of Interstella 5555: The 5tory of the 5ecret 5tar 5ystem, a 2003 film featuring tracks from Discovery as its soundtrack. Human After All, the duo's third studio album, was released in March 2005 to mixed reviews. Nonetheless, the album topped the Billboard Dance/Electronic Albums chart and peaked at number three in France. Human After All featured the singles "Robot Rock", "Technologic", "Human After All" and "The Prime Time of Your Life".

Following their Alive 2006/2007 tour, Daft Punk composed the score for the 2010 film Tron: Legacy and released an accompanying soundtrack album. The album produced the single "Derezzed" and became the duo's first top five album on the Billboard 200. It also received gold certifications from the Recording Industry Association of America (RIAA) and the SNEP. Random Access Memories, Daft Punk's first studio album in eight years, was released in May 2013 and topped several charts worldwide. In France, the album was Daft Punk's first release to debut at number one, a position it retained for three consecutive weeks after its release. "Get Lucky", the first single from Random Access Memories, also experienced chart success in several countries. In 2016, Daft Punk was featured on two singles from Canadian R&B singer The Weeknd entitled "Starboy" and "I Feel It Coming". The former topped charts in several countries and received a platinum certification from the RIAA, while the latter peaked at number one in France and earned a diamond certification from the SNEP. The duo officially broke up in February 2021; however, during December of the same year, the Tron: Legacy soundtrack reentered and topped the Dance/Electronic Albums chart after a vinyl edition of the album was released in Target stores.

Albums

Studio albums

Live albums

Soundtrack albums

Remix albums

Compilation albums

Video albums

Singles

As lead artist

As featured artist

Other charted songs

Production and remix credits

Music videos

Notes

See also
 List of songs recorded by Daft Punk

References

External links
 Official website
 Daft Punk at AllMusic
 
 Daft Punk discography at MusicTea
 

Discography
Discographies of French artists
Electronic music discographies